Brigid Boden is an Irish singer and songwriter.

Early life and education
Boden was born in Dublin Ireland.  As a child, Boden studied dance there and later in New York City, culminating in a scholarship to the Dance Theatre of Harlem. She then moved back to London to focus on songwriting.

Career
After sending demo recordings to producer and musician Kevin Armstrong, Brigid signed with A&M/PolyGram Records and released one album in 1996, the lead single of which, "Oh, How I Cry", peaked at No. 44 on Billboard's Hot Dance Music/Club Play charts in 1997 with help of a remix by Todd Terry. A&M was absorbed by Interscope Records in 1999, and Boden did not release any new material until 2007, when a second album was released by Universal Records.    She has also recorded music for several soundtracks, including Dead Man Walking and The Lord of the Rings: War of the Ring, and has begun recording her third album.

Discography
Brigid Boden (A&M/PolyGram Records, 1997)
Innocence is Not a Crime (Universal Records, 2007)
Dublin to Dakar (Putumayo)
Blue Ocean suite (Kunduru Music)
Buddha Bar presents Living Theatre/ vol 1/vol 2
Buddha Bar/ Chill out in Paris vol 2

References

Living people
1962 births
Irish women singers
Singers from Dublin (city)